This was the first edition of the tournament.

Antonio Šančić and Tristan-Samuel Weissborn won the title after defeating Lukáš Rosol and Vitaliy Sachko 7–6(7–4), 4–6, [10–7] in the final.

Seeds

Draw

References

External links
 Main draw

Città di Forlì II - Doubles